Frank Bernhardt (born 26 August 1969) is a German professional football manager and former player. He managed Estonian Meistriliiga team JK Tallinna Kalev from December 2012 until the end of 2013. From February 2014 until December 2015, Bernhardt worked as technical director for the Azerbaijan Football Federation.

On 9 December 2015, he was appointed by the Football Association of Malaysia to be the head coach of the Malaysia national under-23 football team. He was removed from the position in March 2017, after the appointment of new FAM  president Tunku Ismail Idris.

References 

Living people
German football managers
JK Tallinna Kalev managers
German footballers
1969 births
Association football midfielders
Sportspeople from Kiel
Expatriate football managers in Estonia